The list of Russian language topics stores articles on grammar and other language-related topics that discuss (or should discuss) peculiarities of the Russian language (as well as of other languages) or provide examples from Russian language for these topics.

The list complements the :Category:Russian language and does not overlap with it. 

The "—" marks articles where the information about Russian language is inadequate or missing.

Categories

 :Category:Cyrillic alphabets
 :Category:Cyrillic letters
 :Category:Cyrillization
 :Category:Language comparison
 :Category:Russian language

Articles

 Adposition
 Assimilation (linguistics) (also reasonably covered in Russian phonology)
 Barbarism (linguistics)
 Capitalization
 Clitic
 Code-switching
 Compound (linguistics)
 Consonant mutation
 Continuous and progressive aspects
 Copula
 Cyrillic script
 Diacritic
 Diminutive
 Double negative
 Expressive loan
 False cognate
 Filler (linguistics) —
 Foreign language influences in English —
 Four-letter word
 Frequentative
 Gemination
 Gender-neutrality in languages with grammatical gender
 Gobbledygook
 Grammatical aspect
 Grammatical cases:
 Accusative case
 Dative case
 Genitive case
 Instrumental case
 Locative case
 Nominative case
 Prepositional case
 Vocative case
 Grammatical mood
 Hypothetical mood
 Hypocorism
 Iotation
 Khalyava
 Language game —
 Letter Zyu
 List of ethnic slurs
 List of offensive terms per nationality
 List of etymologies of country subdivision names
 Malapropism#Examples in Russian language
 Measure word
 Metasyntactic variable
 Minimal pair
 Minced oath —
 Mondegreen
 Mojibake
 Morse code
 Morse code for Russian language —
 Non-native pronunciations of English
 Palatalization
 Palindrome
 Pangram --> List of pangrams
 Patronymic
 Paschal greeting
 Piphilology
 Placeholder name (kadigan)
 Phonemes
 Alveolar trill
 Sibilant consonant
 Voiceless velar fricative
 Pseudo-anglicism
 Relaxed pronunciation
 Russification
 Shibboleth —
 Slavic languages
 Stress (linguistics)
 Isochrony —
 Titlo
 T-V distinction
 Unstressed vowel —
 Untranslatability
 Zaum

 
Russian language
Language